Serena Maria Auñón-Chancellor (born April 9, 1976) is an American physician, engineer, and NASA astronaut.
She visited the ISS as a flight engineer for Expedition 56/57 on the International Space Station.

Education
Auñón-Chancellor attended Poudre High School in Fort Collins, Colorado. She holds a B.S. degree in Electrical Engineering from George Washington University, an M.D. from the University of Texas Health Science Center at Houston (UTHealth) in 2001, and an M.P.H. degree from the University of Texas Medical Branch (UTMB) in 2006.  She completed a three-year residency in internal medicine at UTMB in Galveston, Texas, in 2004, and then completed an additional year as Chief Resident.  She also completed an aerospace medicine residency at UTMB.  She is board-certified in Internal Medicine and Aerospace Medicine.

Medical career
Auñón-Chancellor was hired by NASA as a flight surgeon and spent over nine months in Russia supporting medical operations for International Space Station astronauts.

She received the 2009 Julian E. Ward Memorial Award from the Aerospace Medical Association for her contributions to spaceflight crewmember clinical care and development of medical kits to support launch and landing in Kazakhstan.

NASA career
Auñón-Chancellor was selected as an astronaut candidate in June 2009. She completed the astronaut candidacy training program in 2011.

As part of her training, she spent two months in Antarctica from 2010 to 2011 as part of the ANSMET expedition. The ANSMET expedition consisted of a 9-member systematic team and a 4-member reconnaissance team that explored new areas where future teams may go. Collectively they returned over 1200 meteorites.

She served as the deputy crew surgeon for STS-127 and Expedition 22. She also serves as the deputy lead for Orion – Medical Operations.

NEEMO
In June 2012, Auñón piloted a DeepWorker 2000 submersible as part of the NASA/NOAA NEEMO 16 underwater exploration mission off Key Largo, Florida.

In July 2015, Auñón-Chancellor participated as an aquanaut in the NEEMO 20 crew.

Management Astronaut
Aunon-Chancellor is a Management Astronaut and covers medical issues and on-orbit support in the Astronaut Office. In January 2020, she released a study on an unnamed astronaut who had to treat their own deep vein thrombosis on the International Space Station.

Russian ISS accusations
In 2021 Russian state-owned news service TASS published accusations from an anonymous source claiming Auñón-Chancellor drilled a hole in the Soyuz spacecraft module attached to the ISS in 2018.  No evidence implicating Auñón-Chancellor was given.  The accusation was denied by NASA, and came during a period of increasingly poor relations between NASA and the Russian space agency following the near-disastrous incident involving Russia’s Nauka ISS module.

Research 
Auñón-Chancellor's research is concerned with the medical implications of space radiation exposure, including computer modelling of the radiation environment of a crewed orbiting spacecraft.

Personal life
Auñón's father is Jorge Auñón, a Cuban exile who arrived in the United States in 1960; her mother is Margaret Auñón.

Auñón-Chancellor is married to physicist Jeff Chancellor and has a step-daughter named Serafina Chancellor (from previous marriage of her husband). They currently live in League City, Texas.

Auñón-Chancellor is a licensed amateur radio operator with the call sign of KG5TMT. She earned her Technician Class license and was granted her callsign by the Federal Communications Commission (FCC) on June 2, 2017.  Auñón-Chancellor made random (unscheduled) ham radio contacts from the ISS, generally working morning and early afternoon Saturday (US Time) passes over the US during the final weeks of her ISS mission.

Honors and awards
Auñón-Chancellor has received the following awards and honors:
 2004 - Thomas N. and Gleaves James Award for Excellent Performance by a Third-Year Resident in Internal Medicine. 
 2006 - William K. Douglas Award
 2007 - Outstanding UTMB Resident Award 
 2009 - United States Air Force Flight Surgeons Julian Ward Award

See also

References

External links
 
Spacefacts biography of Serena M. Auñón
5 Things You Didn’t Know About Astronaut Serena Auñón-Chancellor NASA Johnson Space Center YouTube Channel, June 5, 2018

1976 births
Living people
American people of Cuban descent
Aquanauts
Physician astronauts
Women astronauts
NASA civilian astronauts
George Washington University School of Engineering and Applied Science alumni
University of Texas Health Science Center at Houston alumni
University of Texas Medical Branch alumni
People from Indianapolis
People from League City, Texas
Amateur radio people
Hispanic and Latino American scientists
Hispanic and Latino American women physicians
21st-century American women scientists
21st-century American women physicians
21st-century American physicians
Hispanic and Latino American aviators